is a Japanese footballer who plays as a midfielder for Albirex Niigata.

Career statistics

References

External links

2002 births
Living people
Japanese footballers
Japan youth international footballers
Association football midfielders
Albirex Niigata players
J2 League players